"Be with You" is a single by English synthpop duo Erasure, released as the second single from their 2011 album Tomorrow's World. The song was written by Andy Bell and Vince Clarke, whilst it was produced by electropop musician Frankmusik who produced the rest of the Tomorrow's World album. The B-side "Never Let You Down" was also written by the duo, but produced by Clarke.

Track listings
CD Single (UK and Europe) CD MUTE 470
"Be with You" (Radio Mix) – 3:33   
"Be with You" (Moto Blanco Remix Radio Edit) – 3:32   
"Never Let You Down" – 3:31   
"Be with You" (Love Is Coming) – 6:57   
"Be with You" (Moto Blanco Club Mix) - 7:17   
"Be with You" (Starshapes Remix) – 4:57   
"Be with You" (Acoustic Version) – 3:26

References

2011 singles
Erasure songs
Songs written by Vince Clarke
Songs written by Andy Bell (singer)
Mute Records singles
2011 songs